Nirmala Bhuria is minister of state for health in Government of Madhya Pradesh in India. She was elected to Madhya Pradesh Legislative Assembly in 2008 from Petlawad in Jhabua district as a candidate of Bharatiya Janata Party. Nirmala is daughter of veteran tribal leader Dilip Singh Bhuria.

References

Living people
People from Jhabua district
1967 births
Madhya Pradesh MLAs 2008–2013
Bharatiya Janata Party politicians from Madhya Pradesh
21st-century Indian women politicians
21st-century Indian politicians
Women members of the Madhya Pradesh Legislative Assembly